The discography of American singer Vivian Green includes seven studio albums and 20 singles.

Albums

Singles

Guest appearances

References

Columbia Records